Nilakanth Moreshvar Pingale was the second Peshwa of the Maratha Empire. He was the son of Moropant Trimbak Pingale and the elder brother of Bahiroji Pingale.

In 1689, he was killed together with the Maratha King Sambhaji.

References

People of the Maratha Empire
People from Maharashtra
1689 deaths